The 1922 North Down by-election was held on 21 July 1922.  The by-election was held due to the assassination of the incumbent UUP MP, Henry Wilson who had been elected in the February 1922 North Down by-election.  It was won unopposed by the UUP candidate John Simms.

Result

External links 
A Vision Of Britain Through Time

References

North Down
By-elections to the Parliament of the United Kingdom in County Down constituencies
Unopposed by-elections to the Parliament of the United Kingdom in Northern Irish constituencies
20th century in County Down
1922 elections in Northern Ireland